Marjorie Esa (born 1934) is an Inuit artist known for her drawings and stone carvings. She was born in the Nuqsarhaarjuk camp and lives in Baker Lake, Nunavut. 

Her work is included in the collections of the Winnipeg Art Gallery the National Gallery of Canada and the Art Gallery of Guelph.

References

1934 births
20th-century Canadian women artists
21st-century Canadian women artists
Inuit artists
Living people